The Interdisciplinary Centre for Law and ICT (ICRI) is an interdisciplinary centre based at the Katholieke Universiteit Leuven, Leuven. ICRI focuses its research on the interplay of Law and ICT and has been involved in numerous national and European projects relating to IT Law.

External links
Interdisciplinary Centre for Law and ICT

Université catholique de Louvain